The Church of Saints Cosmas and Damian, Stade ( or St. Cosmae) is a Lutheran church in Stade, Germany.

The church was built in the early 12th century and extended in the 17th century. Vincent Lübeck served as organist of St. Cosmae between 1675 and 1702.

References
Else Alpers, St. Cosmaekirche Stade, Stade: Schaumburg, 1981
Martin Boyken, „Die Malerei des Gertrudenaltars in St. Cosmae zu Stade. Die Jungfrau und der Teufel“, in: Stader Jahrbuch, N.F. vol. 42 (1952), pp. 89–100
Paul Krause, „Die Schmiedegitter der St. Cosmaekirche in Stade“, in: Stader Jahrbuch, N.F. vol. 44 (1954), pp. 171–174
Fritz Starcke, Die St. Cosmae-Kirche in Stade, Wienhausen and Celle: Niedersächsisches Bild-Archiv, 1928, (=Norddeutsche Kunstbücher; vol. 22)

External links
 
  St. Cosmae-St.Nicolai official parish site

Notes

Cosmae
Stade Cosmae
Stade Cosmae
Stade Cosmae